This is a partial list of people buried at St. Martin's Cathedral in Bratislava, Slovakia. St. Martin's Cathedral is known especially for previously being the coronation church of the Kingdom of Hungary and since it was built over an old cemetery, it contains catacombs of unknown length and several crypts containing the sepulchres of many significant historical figures, up to six meters beneath the church.

Over the centuries, the cathedral's sepulchres filled with many significant figures, such as ecclesiastic dignitaries, presidents of the historic Pozsony county as well as J. I. Bajza, the author of the first Slovak novel, but also with dozens of bishops, canons, French priests fleeing the French revolution and many people outside the Catholic church.

List of people buried at St. Martin's Cathedral 
This is a partial list of graves at St. Martin's Cathedral:

There is also the grave of Schomberg George - the Vice-Chancellor of Academia Istropolitana, Mikuláš II. Pálfi (Palffy) who died  in 1606 in Červený Kameň, Pavol IV. Pálfi (Palffy) who died on November 26, 1653 (except his heart), a Palatine of Hungary, Ján III. Anton Pálfi (Palffy) who died in 1694 in Bratislava (except his heart), Štefan II. Pálfi (Palffy) who died on May 29, 1646, buried together with his mother and his brother Ján II. Pálfi (Palffy).

St. Martin's Cathedral picture gallery

See also 
 List of cathedrals in Slovakia
 History of Bratislava

References 

Buried at St. Martin's Cathedral, Bratislava
Buried at St. Martin's Cathedral, Bratislava
Buried at St. Martin's Cathedral, Bratislava
Death in Slovakia
Buried at St. Martin's Cathedral, Bratislava
Bratislava, St. Martin's Cathedral